Heathers is an American black comedy television series, created by Jason Micallef, that premiered on October 25, 2018, on Paramount Network. Its first season, a modern-day reboot of the 1988 film of the same name written by Daniel Waters, follows high school student Veronica Sawyer (played by Grace Victoria Cox) and her conflicts with a self-titled clique consisting of three fellow students who share the name Heather. The series was intended to be an anthology, with each season taking place in an entirely different setting from the original film.

The series was originally in development for TV Land, but it was moved to the 2018 launch slate for its rebranded sister network Paramount Network, with a premiere scheduled for March 2018. In the wake of the Stoneman Douglas High School shooting and the program's subject matter, Paramount Network delayed the premiere to July 2018. However, on June 1, 2018, Paramount Network's parent company Viacom dropped Heathers entirely due to continued concern for its content following the 2018 Santa Fe High School shooting two weeks prior.

Despite the premiere's cancellation in the United States, the series had already been sold in international markets where it went on to debut as previously scheduled in its original ten-episode version. It aired for the first time on July 11, 2018, on HBO Europe in select European territories.

On October 4, 2018, it was announced that the series would premiere in United States on October 25, 2018, on Paramount Network over the course of five nights. The series was edited for content by the network resulting in numerous cuts and the number of episodes being reduced from 10 to nine, with the original final two episodes being combined into one.

Despite reports by the writers that a second season, Heathers: Revolution, had a complete script, Paramount Network's president Kent Alterman announced in an interview on May 1, 2019, that there were no plans to continue Heathers following its first and only season.

Premise
In the town of Sherwood, Ohio, Veronica Sawyer (Grace Victoria Cox) is the newest member of the most powerful clique at Westerberg High School, "the Heathers"; Heather Chandler (Melanie Field), a rich girl who is fairly famous on social media for her social justice posts, and her "sidekicks" Heather Duke (Brendan Scannell) and Heather McNamara (Jasmine Mathews). Veronica has a deep-seated jealousy of the Heathers, a jealousy that turns into hatred towards Heather Chandler and the status quo she maintains. One day, Veronica is confronted with the realization that, unlike her classmates, she has no real sense of individuality and is destined to be forgotten. Joined by a jaded and aloof transfer student named Jason "J.D." Dean (James Scully), Veronica hopes to make her way through her senior year with all of her morals intact.

Cast and characters

Main
 Grace Victoria Cox as Veronica Sawyer, a self-described "good person" who struggles with her sense of identity and is a part of the most popular clique of Westerberg
 Maisie de Krassel portrays a young Veronica in four episodes
 Melanie Field as Heather Chandler, the social justice warrior leader of the most popular clique of Westerberg's senior class and the queen bee of the school. She has gained major traction on a number of social media platforms.
 Emma Shannon portrays a young Heather in the episode "Reindeer Games"
 James Scully as Jason "JD" Dean, Veronica's love interest and a new student at Westerburg with the tendency to wax poetic about the adolescent experience
 Maverick Thompson portrays a young JD in the pilot episode
 Brendan Scannell as Heather Duke, a member of the Heathers who identifies as genderqueer. She is Heather Chandler's second-in-command and does not hesitate to talk down to whomever she views as lesser than her.
 Jack R. Lewis portrays a young Heather in the episode "Do I Look Like Mother Teresa?"
 Jasmine Mathews as Heather McNamara, a biracial girl who identified as a lesbian but, after being exposed for having an affair with an adult faculty member, is outed as bisexual and becomes a social pariah. She seems to be the most naive and timid member of the Heathers with an underlying transphobia problem.

Recurring

 Deanna Cheng as Pauline Fleming, Westerberg's driven guidance counselor
 Drew Droege as Maurice Dennis, Westerberg's melodramatic art teacher
 Kurt Fuller as Principal Gowan, the principal of Westerburg High School
 Travis Schuldt as Coach Cox, Westerberg's football coach
 Nikki SooHoo as Betty Finn, Veronica's childhood friend, who secretly wants to be just as popular as her
Ella Gross portrays a young Betty in three episodes
 Cameron Gellman as Kurt Kelly, the quarterback of the Westerburg High School football team who is secretly dating Heather Duke
 Mandy June Turpin as Mrs. Sawyer, Veronica's oblivious mother
 Wallace Langham as Kevin Sawyer, Veronica's oblivious father
 Rebecca Wisocky as Martha Chandler, Heather Chandler's mother and a former stage actress who does not believe that her daughter has any talent
 Jamie Kaler as Big Bud Dean, JD's father and the owner of Big Bud Oil and Gas, an oil and gas company
 Matthew Rocheleau as David Waters, a Westerburg teacher who has an affair with Heather McNamara
 Brett Cooper as Brianna Parker/"Trailer Parker", a poor student at Westerburg High who is bullied due to her social class
 Jesse Leigh as Peter Dawson, Class President of Westerburg High School, a gossip, and a member of the "Gay Nerds"
 Romel De Silva as Kyle, one of Peter's best friends who is obsessed with the Heathers and is a member of the "Gay Nerds"
 Adwin Brown as Seth, a member of the "Gay Nerds"
 Jeremy Culhane as Dylen Lutz, a lovable loser who is picked on by most of the student body
 Christina Burdette as Jesus Julie, a religious student who is friends with Betty and Shelby
 Annalisa Cochrane as Shelby Dunnstock, a ditzy cheerleader who is one of Betty Finn's friends and is constantly undermined by the Heathers
 Sophia Grosso as Driffany Tompkins, a Westerburg student
 Allyn Morse as Annie, a Westerburg student
 Paige Weldon as Lily, a Westerburg student

Guest

 Cayden Boyd as Ram Sweeney, the best friend of Kurt Kelly and another member of the Westerburg High School football team (4 episodes)
 Karen Maruyama as Mrs. Finn, Betty's mother (4 episodes)
 Birgundi Baker as Lizzy, a new student at Westerburg High, who was raised in the foster care system and is eager to learn the ways of Heather Chandler (3 episodes)
 Reece Caddell as Lucy McCord, a childhood friend of Veronica and Betty who was murdered with a croquet mallet (3 episodes)
 Jen Zaborowski as Mrs. Zaborowski, a Westerburg teacher (3 episodes)
 Joel Spence as Mr. Chandler, Heather Chandler's father (2 episodes)
 Lilli Birdsell as Mrs. McNamara, Heather McNamara's mother (2 episodes)
 Phil LaMarr as Mr. McNamara, Heather McNamara's father (2 episodes)
 April Bowlby as Teyna, Big Bud Dean's girlfriend (2 episodes)
 Salma Khan as Amita, an influencer (2 episodes)
 James Kirkland as a disc jockey at Betty's party and the prom (2 episodes)
 Vic Chao as Mr. Finn, Betty's father (2 episodes)
 Casey Wilson as Lexi Anne, a news anchor (2 episodes)
 Evan Crooks as Jacob, Veronica's hook up at the art exhibit ("Pilot")
 Michael D. Roberts as Captain Lehman ("Reindeer Games")
 Mo Gaffney as Margie Kane ("Call Us When the Shuttle Lands")
 Josh Fadem as Dathan ("I'm a No-Rust-Build-Up Man Myself")
 Jeannetta Arnette as Mrs. Kelly ("I'm a No-Rust-Build-Up Man Myself")
 Larry Poindexter as Mr. Kelly ("I'm a No-Rust-Build-Up Man Myself")
 Jen Caldwell as Cathy Ishmael ("I'm a No-Rust-Build-Up Man Myself")
 Camille Hyde as Rebecca ("I'm a No-Rust-Build-Up Man Myself")

Special guest-star
 Selma Blair as Jade Duke, Heather Duke's step-mother, a stripper and menthol smoker who's biding her time until her 82-year-old husband dies (4 episodes)
 Shannen Doherty as Mrs. Dean, JD's mom who committed suicide when he was just a child. Doherty played Heather Duke in the original 1988 film Heathers.
 Doherty also appears as Dr. Destiny during a hallucination in the episode "Reindeer Games"

Episodes

Notes

Production

Development

On August 27, 2009, Sony Pictures Television announced that Heathers was to be adapted for television to air on Fox. Mark Rizzo was hired to write the series, and Jenny Bicks was to co-produce with Lakeshore Entertainment. The program was described as a modernized version of the original story, and all characters from the film were expected to be scripted into the adaptation.

On September 12, 2012, it was announced that the television network Bravo would begin developing a Heathers reboot unrelated to the earlier announcement by Sony Pictures Television. The storyline was to pick up twenty years after the events of the film when Veronica returns home to Sherwood, Ohio with her teenage daughter, who had to contend with the next generation of mean girls, all named "Ashley". They were to all be the daughters of the two surviving Heathers. Neither Ryder nor Slater were attached to the project. In August 2013, Bravo declined to order the series.

On January 13, 2017, TV Land ordered a newly developed iteration of the series, described as an anthology dark comedy set in the present day. The series was set to be written by Jason Micallef and Tom Rosenberg, with Gary Lucchesi serving as an executive producer for Lakeshore Entertainment. On January 13, 2017, Heathers was ordered to series at TV Land.

On March 16, 2017, it was reported that the series would move to Paramount Network, a planned rebranding of TV Land's sister network Spike. On June 1, 2018, however, it was announced that Paramount Network had dropped the series due to concerns over its content in the wake of recent school shootings in the United States. It was reported that the series' producers had begun to shop the series to other broadcasters, and that writing for a potential second season had neared completion, which would take place in an entirely different setting than the first season and original film. By July 16, 2018, it was reported that both Netflix and Freeform had passed on the series. On October 4, 2018, it was announced that Viacom and Paramount Network had reversed their decision on the series and that, following various edits and a reduction in episode count from 10 to 9, the series would premiere on the cable network on October 25, 2018.

Casting
On October 11, 2016, it was announced that James Scully and Grace Victoria Cox had been cast in the male and female leads J.D. and Veronica. Later that month, Melanie Field, Brendan Scannell, and Jasmine Mathews joined the main cast as the titular "Heathers" (Heather Chandler, Heather Duke, and Heather McNamara, respectively). On November 22, 2016, it was announced that original film cast member Shannen Doherty had been cast as a pivotal character in the series' pilot episode. It was later reported that she is set to appear in three of the first season's episodes in total. On June 23, 2017, Birgundi Baker and Cameron Gellman signed onto the series in the recurring roles of Lizzy and Kurt, respectively. On July 6, 2017, it was reported that Selma Blair had been cast in the recurring role of Jade, "the gold-digging stepmother to Heather Duke" who is described as "a stripper menthol smoker who is rough around the edges, but with a bit of glamour to her."

Filming
In November 2016, the series' pilot began production in Los Angeles, California. Principal photography for the rest of the first season took place from spring through fall of 2017 in the Chatsworth area of Los Angeles. Locations utilized for filming included the Rancho San Antonio which is being used to portray Westerburg High School.

Release

Marketing
On August 28, 2017, the Paramount Network released a teaser trailer for the series alongside a series of posters, each depicting a different character. On February 18, 2018, the first official trailer for the series was released. Beginning on February 12, 2018, a series of promotional posters, each depicting a different character, were released. On October 23, 2018, a clip from the series featuring Selma Blair as her character Jade was released. A day later, a second clip was released and a day after that a third clip was released as well.

Premiere
The series was initially set to debut on March 7, 2018. However, on February 28, 2018, it was announced that the premiere would be delayed in light of the Stoneman Douglas High School shooting. Paramount Network released a statement explaining their decision saying, "Paramount Network's original series Heathers is a satirical comedy that takes creative risks in dealing with many of society's most challenging subjects ranging from personal identity to race and socio-economic status to gun violence. While we stand firmly behind the show, in light of the recent tragic events in Florida and out of respect for the victims, their families and loved ones, we feel the right thing to do is delay the premiere until later this year." On March 14, 2018, Viacom suspended programming across all of its networks, including Paramount Network, for 17 minutes due to its support of student-led protests and campaigns that emerged in the wake of the Stoneman Douglas shootings.

On May 1, 2018, it was announced that the series would officially premiere on Paramount Network on July 10, 2018. On June 1, 2018, it was reported that Paramount Network had dropped the series entirely, and that it would be shopped to other networks. Viacom executives became increasingly uncomfortable with airing the program due to its themes; another major school shooting, the 2018 Santa Fe High School shooting, had occurred in May 2018. Keith Cox, the network's president of development, noted that the pilot had been filmed "before the climate changed", and that "the combination of a high school show with these very dark moments didn't feel right".

On October 4, 2018, it was reported that the series would premiere on October 25, 2018 on Paramount Network over the course of five nights. The series was edited for content by the network resulting in numerous cuts or changes including the removal of a scene in the finale where Westerburg High School is blown-up and the altering of a scene in episode 5 that featured a first-person video game with teachers holding guns. Ultimately, the edits resulted in the number of episodes being reduced from 10 to 9, with the Paramount Network's dedicated application and website on October 22, 2018. Following the premiere of the final episode on October 29, 2018, a Heathers-themed episode of Lip Sync Battle was slated to air featured guests including Melanie Field and Brendan Scannell.

Following the Pittsburgh synagogue shooting on October 27, 2018, Paramount Network decided to pull episodes seven and eight from their schedule and declined to broadcast them on television. The two episodes had previously been made available on Paramount Network's official website and application on October 22, 2018. The ninth and final episode ultimately aired on October 29, 2018 as originally scheduled.

Distribution
Though Paramount Network had pulled the series, the production companies involved with the show had already sold the series' international broadcast rights. The series airs on HBO Europe in Bosnia and Herzegovina, Bulgaria, Croatia, Czech Republic, Hungary, Kosovo, Macedonia, Moldova, Montenegro, Poland, Romania, Serbia, Slovakia and Slovenia. It started airing twice a week on July 11, 2018 on HBO Europe streaming service with a weekly run airing on television beginning in September in those territories. Additionally, HBO Europe subscribers in Denmark, Finland, Norway and Sweden started getting episodes twice a week on the streaming service on July 11, 2018. Subscribers in Spain and Andorra got the first three episodes on HBO Europe streaming service on the same date, with the remaining installments dropping on July 18, 2018. Additionally, HBO Europe subscribers in Portugal, Angola, Cape Verde, Guinea, Bissau, Mozambique, São Tomé and Príncipe begin streaming the series on a future date. Digiturk licensed the series in Turkey and Cyprus for premium subscribers with weekly episodes launching July 20, 2018. In Greece, OTE began broadcasting one episode a week starting on July 15, 2018. In Iceland, Síminn's video-on-demand service began streaming the series on July 12, 2018. In Australia, every episode of the series launched on September 28, 2018 on Stan. In the United Kingdom, the series is available in its original 10 episodes version on StarzPlay.

Soundtracks
Coinciding with the American premiere of the series, Lakeshore Records released two soundtracks for the series. On October 12, 2018, Lakeshore released Heathers - Original Television Series Soundtrack featuring songs from the series by various artists including DJ Shadow, Poison, and Peggy Lee. A limited vinyl edition was released in Urban Outfitters stores on January 25, 2019. On October 19, 2018, Lakeshore released Heathers - Original Television Series Score consisting of the show's original score composed by Chris Alan Lee.

Reception
The series was panned by critics and fans alike on both the initial release of the pilot episode and the official premiere of the series. On the review aggregation website Rotten Tomatoes, the series holds a 29% approval rating with an average rating of 5.38 out of 10 based on 21 reviews. The website's critical consensus reads, "Despite promising performers, Heathers aspirational angst is let down by its blunt, misguided attempts at social commentary." Metacritic, which uses a weighted average, assigned the series a score of 40 out of 100 based on 9 critics, indicating "mixed to average reviews."

In a negative review, Daniel Fienberg of  The Hollywood Reporter described the series as "a pale imitation" of the 1988 film, and went on to say that, "Having the high school tyranny associated with a gang of students who, in a different era, might have been marginalized produces a dark and almost reactionary undercurrent in which the disenfranchised aren't being bullied, but rather are wielding identity politics and political correctness as weapons". Leigh Monson of Birth.Movies.Death was similarly negative saying that she saw in the show's dynamics "a longing for the good old days when non-whites and queers knew their place." Monson concluded, "Heathers is a hateful, bigoted exercise in regression hiding behind the guise of dark comedy, and I can only hope it doesn't gain the Trumpian audience it so clearly craves." Samantha Allen of The Daily Beast panned the series saying, "If you believe that kids these days are fragile "snowflakes," that political correctness is running amok, and that LGBT people are now society's true bullies, this new Heathers is the show for you. The premiere of the rebooted cult classic, now airing for free online, takes place in a universe — clearly a fictional one—where the football team is oppressed and yesteryear's fat, queer, and black victims now rule the school with manicured fists. The show feels like it was written for aging Fox News viewers who get angry about people's gender pronouns — which is odd because it's clearly being marketed to a young and therefore progressive-leaning audience who may not remember the ... original."

References

External links
 
 

2010s American black comedy television series
2010s American high school television series
2018 American television series debuts
2018 American television series endings
2010s American anthology television series
Paramount Network original programming
Body image in popular culture
Murder–suicide in television
Suicide in television
Television series about bullying
Television series about teenagers
Live action television shows based on films
Television shows filmed in Los Angeles
Television shows set in Ohio
English-language television shows